Magazine Dreams is a 2023 American drama film written and directed by Elijah Bynum. It stars Jonathan Majors, Haley Bennett, Taylour Paige, Mike O'Hearn, Harrison Page and Harriet Sansom Harris. 

It had its world premiere at the 2023 Sundance Film Festival on January 20, 2023. It received positive reviews from critics.

Premise
Magazine Dreams follows aspiring bodybuilder Killian Maddox (Majors), who struggles to find human connection in this exploration of celebrity and violence. Nothing deters him from his fiercely protected dream of superstardom, not even the doctors who warn him of the permanent damage he causes to himself with his quest.

Cast
 Jonathan Majors as Killian Maddox
 Haley Bennett as Jessie, a grocery store worker and Maddox's love-interest
 Taylour Paige as Pink Coat, a prostitute
 Mike O'Hearn as Brad Vanderhorn, a professional body builder and Killian's idol
 Harrison Page as William Lattimore, Killian's grandfather 
 Harriet Sansom Harris as Killian's counselor 
 Bradley Stryker as Ken Donaghue, a roofing and plumbing worker who assaults Killian
 Dan Donahue as Dr Prescott, Killian's doctor
 Craig Cackowski as a bodybuilding contest judge who placed Killian poorly

Production
In October 2021, Jonathan Majors joined the cast of the film, with Elijah Bynum directing from a screenplay he wrote, with Majors also serving as an executive producer, and Jennifer Fox and Dan Gilroy serving as producers. In July 2022, Haley Bennett, Taylour Paige and Mike O'Hearn joined the cast of the film.

In preparation for the role, Majors ate 6,100 calories a day for four months and would body-build for six hours every day to obtain and maintain the extreme muscular physique of his role.

Release
It had its world premiere at the 2023 Sundance Film Festival on January 20, 2023. At the premiere, the jurors collectively walked out as the open captioning that was intended for juror Marlee Matlin malfunctioned. The following month, Searchlight Pictures acquired distribution rights to the film with plans to release it theatrically later in 2023.

Reception 
On the review aggregator website Rotten Tomatoes, 87% of 83 critics' reviews are positive, with an average rating of 7.1/10. The critics' consensus reads: "Its dramatic form may get a little wobbly during certain reps, but Jonathan Majors' incredibly committed performance makes Magazine Dreams well worth a watch." Metacritic, which uses a weighted average, assigned the film a score of 72 out of 100, based on 22 critics, indicating "generally favorable reviews".

References

External links
 

2023 films
American drama films
2023 independent films
American independent films
2020s American films
2023 drama films
2020s English-language films
Searchlight Pictures films